William Sorensen was a New Zealand rugby league footballer who represented New Zealand in the 1954, 1957 and 1960 World Cups. His brother Dave also played for the Kiwis as did two of his nephews; Dane and Kurt.

Playing career
Sorensen was a member of the Ponsonby United Rugby League Club and represented Auckland.

He played in twenty four tests for the New Zealand national rugby league team, including seven games at the 1954, 1957 and 1960 World Cups. He was selected to go on the 1955–56 New Zealand rugby tour of Great Britain and France. After the 1957 World Cup Sorensen played for the Rest of the World against Australia.

Sorensen also represented the New Zealand Māori side. He retired following the 1960 World Cup.

In 1963 Sorensen was player-coach for a New South Wales country team.

Coaching career
Sorensen was the Auckland coach when they competed in the grand slam in 1977, defeating Australia, France and Great Britain in a three-week period.

He also served as a selector for the New Zealand national rugby league team.

Legacy
He was made a life member of the New Zealand Rugby League in 1991.

Sorensen died in 1996, leaving behind his widow Olga.

His daughter is Debbie Sorensen a prominent Pacific Health leader 

He was inducted into the New Zealand Rugby League's "Legends of League" in 2000.

His grandson is Penrith Panthers forward Scott Sorensen.

References

Year of birth missing
1996 deaths
Tongan emigrants to New Zealand
New Zealand rugby league players
New Zealand national rugby league team players
New Zealand Māori rugby league players
New Zealand Māori rugby league team players
Auckland rugby league team players
Ponsonby Ponies players
New Zealand rugby league administrators
New Zealand rugby league coaches
Auckland rugby league team coaches
Rugby league five-eighths
Rugby league centres